These 134 species belong to Pristiphora, a genus of common sawflies in the family Tenthredinidae.

Pristiphora species

 Pristiphora abbreviata (Hartig) i c g
 Pristiphora abietina (Christ, 1791) g
 Pristiphora affinis (Lindqvist, 1952) g
 Pristiphora albilabris (Boheman, 1852) g
 Pristiphora albitibia (Costa, 1859) g
 Pristiphora alpestris (Konow, 1903) g
 Pristiphora anderschi (Zaddach, 1876) g
 Pristiphora angulata Lindqvist, 1974 g
 Pristiphora aphantoneura (Foerster, 1854) g
 Pristiphora appendiculata (Hartig, 1837) g b  (green currantworm)
 Pristiphora aquilegiae (Vollenhoven, 1866) g
 Pristiphora armata (Thomson, 1862) g
 Pristiphora astragali Vikberg, 1978 g
 Pristiphora atlantica Malaise, 1939 g
 Pristiphora atripes (Lindqvist, 1952) g
 Pristiphora banksi  b
 Pristiphora beaumonti Zirngiebl, 1957 g
 Pristiphora bensoni Lindqvist, 1953 g
 Pristiphora bifida (Hellén, 1948) g
 Pristiphora biscalis (Foerster, 1854) g
 Pristiphora bivittata (Norton, 1861) b
 Pristiphora borea (Konow, 1904) g
 Pristiphora borneensis Forsius g
 Pristiphora breadalbanensis (Cameron, 1882) g
 Pristiphora brevis (Hartig, 1837) g
 Pristiphora brunniapex Lindqvist, 1960 g
 Pristiphora bufo (Brischke, 1883) g
 Pristiphora cadma Wong & Ross, 1960 g
 Pristiphora camtschatcalis (Enslin, 1927) g
 Pristiphora carinata (Hartig, 1837) g
 Pristiphora carpathiensis Haris, 2001 g
 Pristiphora chalybeata Benson g
 Pristiphora chlorea (Norton) b
 Pristiphora cincta Newman, 1837 g b
 Pristiphora coactula (Ruthe, 1859) g
 Pristiphora compressa (Hartig, 1837) g
 Pristiphora concolor (Lindqvist, 1952) g
 Pristiphora condei Lindqvist, 1955 g
 Pristiphora confusa Lindqvist, 1955 g
 Pristiphora congener (W.F.Kirby, 1882) g
 Pristiphora coniceps Lindqvist, 1955 g
 Pristiphora conjugata (Dahlbom, 1835) g
 Pristiphora crassicornis (Hartig, 1837) g
 Pristiphora cretica W.Schedl, 1981 g
 Pristiphora dasiphorae Zinovjev, 1993 g
 Pristiphora decipiens (Enslin, 1916) g
 Pristiphora denudata Konow, 1902 g
 Pristiphora depressa Hartig, 1840 g
 Pristiphora dissimilis Lindqvist, 1971 g
 Pristiphora dochmocera (Thomson, 1871) g
 Pristiphora erichsonii (Hartig) i c g b  (larch sawfly)
 Pristiphora exigua (Lindqvist, 1956) g
 Pristiphora fausta (Hartig, 1837) g
 Pristiphora formosana Rohwer, 1916 g
 Pristiphora forsiusi Enslin, 1916 g
 Pristiphora friesei (Konow, 1904) g
 Pristiphora frigida (Boheman, 1865) g
 Pristiphora fulvipes (Fallén, 1808) g
 Pristiphora gaunitzi Lindqvist, 1968 g
 Pristiphora geniculata (Hartig) i c g b  (mountain ash sawfly)
 Pristiphora gerula (Konow, 1904) g
 Pristiphora glauca Benson, 1954 g
 Pristiphora groenblomi (Lindqvist, 1952) g
 Pristiphora hoverlaensis Haris, 2001 g
 Pristiphora hyperborea Malaise, 1921 g
 Pristiphora idiota Norton, 1867 g
 Pristiphora insularis Rohwer, 1910 g
 Pristiphora kamtchatica Malaise, 1931 g
 Pristiphora karvoneni (Lindqvist, 1952) g
 Pristiphora kontuniemii (Lindqvist, 1952) g
 Pristiphora kuznetzovorum (Enslin, 1919) g
 Pristiphora lanifica (Zaddach, 1883) g
 Pristiphora laricis (Hartig, 1837) g
 Pristiphora lativentris (Thomson, 1871) g
 Pristiphora leucopodia (Hartig, 1837) g
 Pristiphora leucopus Hellén, 1948 g
 Pristiphora listoni Lacourt, 1998 g
 Pristiphora luteipes Lindqvist, 1955 g
 Pristiphora maesta (Zaddach, 1876) g
 Pristiphora malaisei (Lindqvist, 1952) g
 Pristiphora melanocarpa (Hartig, 1840) g
 Pristiphora micronematica Malaise, 1931 g
 Pristiphora mollis (Hartig, 1837) g b
 Pristiphora monogyniae (Hartig, 1840) g
 Pristiphora moravica Gregor, 1940 g
 Pristiphora murielae Lacourt, 1995 g
 Pristiphora nievesi Haris, 2004 g
 Pristiphora nigricans Eversmann, 1847 g
 Pristiphora nigriceps (Hartig, 1840) g
 Pristiphora nordmani (Lindqvist, 1949) g
 Pristiphora normani (Lindqvist, 1949) g
 Pristiphora opaca Lindqvist, 1955 g
 Pristiphora paedida (Konow, 1904) g
 Pristiphora pallida (Konow, 1904) g
 Pristiphora pallidiventris (Fallén, 1808) g
 Pristiphora pallipes Serville, 1823 g
 Pristiphora paralella Hartig, 1840 g
 Pristiphora parnasia Konow, 1902 g
 Pristiphora piceae (Zhelochovtsev, 1988) g
 Pristiphora pseudocoactula (Lindqvist, 1952) g
 Pristiphora pseudodecipiens Beneš & Krístek, 1976 g
 Pristiphora pseudogeniculata Lindqvist, 1969 g
 Pristiphora punctifrons (Thomson, 1871) g
 Pristiphora pusilla Malaise, 1921 g
 Pristiphora pygmaea Lindqvist, 1964 g
 Pristiphora quercus (Hartig, 1837) g
 Pristiphora retusa (Thomson, 1871) g
 Pristiphora reuteri (Lindqvist, 1960) g
 Pristiphora robusta (Konow, 1895) g
 Pristiphora ruficornis (Olivier, 1811) g
 Pristiphora rufipes Lepeletier, 1823 g b  (columbine sawfly)
 Pristiphora saliciphilus (Liston, 2007) g
 Pristiphora sareptana Kuznetzov-Ugamskij, 1924 g
 Pristiphora sauteri Rohwer, 1916 g
 Pristiphora saxesenii (Hartig, 1837) g
 Pristiphora schedli Liston & Späth, 2008 g
 Pristiphora sermola Liston, 1993 g
 Pristiphora sinensis Wong g
 Pristiphora sootryeni Lindqvist, 1955 g
 Pristiphora staudingeri (Ruthe, 1859) g
 Pristiphora subarctica (Forsslund, 1936) g
 Pristiphora subbifida (Thomson, 1871) g
 Pristiphora subopaca Lindqvist, 1955 g
 Pristiphora tenuicornis (Lindqvist, 1955) g
 Pristiphora tenuiserra (Lindqvist, 1958) g
 Pristiphora testacea (Jurine, 1807) g
 Pristiphora tetrica (Zaddach, 1883) g
 Pristiphora thalictri (Kriechbaumer, 1884) g
 Pristiphora thalictrivora Lindqvist, 1962 g
 Pristiphora thomsoni Lindqvist, 1953 g
 Pristiphora trochanterica (Lindqvist, 1952) g
 Pristiphora vicina (Lepeletier, 1823) g
 Pristiphora viridana Konow, 1902 g
 Pristiphora wesmaeli (Tischbein, 1853) g

Data sources: i = ITIS, c = Catalogue of Life, g = GBIF, b = Bugguide.net

References

Pristiphora